Jessica Stapleton (born 7 February 2005) is an Irish footballer who plays as a defender or midfielder for Shelbourne and the Republic of Ireland national team.

Club career

Early career
Stapleton is from Ballyfermot, and began playing soccer for Cherry Orchard when she was eight years old. When she was 11 she became the first girl to be selected for the representative team of the Dublin and District Schoolboys League (DDSL). In 2020 Stapleton played for Shamrock Rovers in the Women's Under-17 National League. After Stapleton captained Rovers to their 2–0 League final defeat by Cork City, she spoke out against sexist remarks made by internet trolls on the comment section of the live feed.

Shelbourne
Stapleton joined Women's National League club Shelbourne for the 2021 season, since Shamrock Rovers lacked a senior women's team. Manchester City had a longstanding interest in signing Stapleton, but regulations arising out of Brexit prevented British clubs from signing any Irish players until they turned 18 years old.

She enjoyed good form in her debut season at senior level, featuring in defence and midfield for Noel King's Shelbourne. Stapleton sometimes played in attack, helping King plug gaps in the Shelbourne team caused by injuries and the departure of several players to professional clubs in the United Kingdom. She was named WNL Player of the Month for October 2021, nominated for Young Player of the Year and named in the Team of the Season. Shelbourne overhauled Peamount United on a dramatic final day to win the 2021 Women's National League title. Stapleton also played in the 2021 FAI Women's Cup Final, but Shelbourne were beaten 3–1 by Wexford Youths.

In 2022 Stapleton continued to play well as Shelbourne claimed a League and Cup "double". She was named Young Player of the Year and retained her place in the Team of the Season. In the 2022 FAI Women's Cup Final Stapleton scored the opening goal and was Player of the Match as Shelbourne beat Athlone Town 2–0 to avenge their defeat in the previous year's final. In November 2022 she was reported to have made an agreement to join West Ham United in June 2023, in preference to several other interested clubs.

International career

Youth

Stapleton represented Ireland at schoolgirl level while she attended Pobalscoil Iosolde. On her full debut for the national under-15 schoolgirl team on 17 February 2018, she scored a goal and was player of the match in a 2–1 win over Northern Ireland.

She progressed to the Republic of Ireland women's national under-17 football team and debuted against Iceland in February 2020. By 2021 Stapleton was playing for Dave Connell's Republic of Ireland women's national under-19 football team. She made six appearances throughout the year, scoring one goal. At the FAI International Football Awards she was named 2022 Under-19 Women's International Player of the Year.

Senior

Senior Republic of Ireland coach Colin Bell called 13-year-old Stapleton into a training camp for home-based national team players in August 2018. She was called up to the senior Republic of Ireland squad for the first time in November 2021, for 2023 FIFA Women's World Cup qualification – UEFA Group A fixtures against Slovakia and Georgia.

Stapleton won her first senior cap on 19 June 2022, as a half-time substitute in a 1–0 friendly win over the Philippines in Antalya, Turkey. Although she had been playing in midfield for her club, national team coach Vera Pauw saw Stapleton as a central defender.

References

External links
 

2005 births
Living people
Republic of Ireland women's association footballers
Republic of Ireland women's international footballers
Women's association football defenders
Shelbourne F.C. (women) players
Association footballers from Dublin (city)
Republic of Ireland women's youth international footballers
Cherry Orchard F.C. players
Shamrock Rovers Ladies F.C. players